Unbelievable is the second studio album by German recording artist Sarah Connor, released by X-Cell Records on September 30, 2002 in German-speaking Europe. Connor re-teamed with Rob Tyger and Kay Denar to work on the majority of the production of the album, consulting additional help from Wyclef Jean, Jerry Duplessis, Bülent Aris, Sugar P, and Triage.

While the album failed to link on the success of its predecessor Green Eyed Soul, it peaked at number 10 on the German Media Control albums chart, selling more than 250,000 copies domestically. Unbelievable also was released in a Spanish edition. Altogether the album spawned four singles: Jean-produced and featured "One Nite Stand (of Wolves and Sheep)", the ballad "Skin on Skin", "He's Unbelievable" (based on a sample of Tupac Shakur's "California Love"), and Connor's North American debut single "Bounce".

Critical reception

AllMusic editor Kingsley Marshall found that Unbelievable has Connor's "unarguably powerful voice soaring above the rock-solid production of sometime-Backstreet Boys desk man Bülent Aris. As is par for the course with the genre, ill-advised ballads handicap an album which didn't realistically require 17 tracks, but these slight indiscretions are unlikely to put off fans baying for a second album of Connor's slick pop."

Track listing

Charts

Certifications

References

External links
 SarahConnor.com — official site

2002 albums
Sarah Connor (singer) albums
Albums produced by Jerry Duplessis
Albums produced by Wyclef Jean